MM6 may refer to:

 Mega Man 6, a 1993 video game for the NES
 Might and Magic VI: The Mandate of Heaven, a 1998 video game for the PC
 Yamaha MM6, a 61-key synthesizer keyboard
 MM6 register, a CPU register used by the MMX extension